= Owen Pelt =

American legislator

Owen D. Pelt (April 23, 1916 - September 17, 1968) was a pastor and state legislator in Illinois. He served in the Illinois House of Representatives from 1967-1968. He was born in Jackson, Mississippi. He was a Democrat.

He was the pastor of Shiloh Baptist Church in Chicago. He co-authored The story of the National Baptists (1960).
